Chlorochroa juniperina is a European species of shield bug in the tribe Nezarini. C. juniperina is distributed in mainland Europe from France through to Scandinavia, but became extinct in England in 1925 due to the decline of juniper, its host. 

The plate below shows C. juniperina - "Pentantoma juniperina Linn" (bottom-right) in The Hemiptera Heteroptera of the British Islands.

References 

Hemiptera of Europe
Bugs described in 1758
Taxa named by Carl Linnaeus
Pentatomini